Chester Victor Clifton Jr. (September 24, 1913 – December 23, 1991) was a major general in the United States Army and an aide to Presidents John F. Kennedy and Lyndon B. Johnson.

Biography
Clifton was born in Edmonton, Alberta, before moving to the United States and settling in Puyallup, Washington. He attended the University of Washington and graduated from the University of Wisconsin-Madison with a master's degree in journalism. As a civilian he worked as a reporter for the Seattle Post-Intelligencer and the New York Herald Tribune and later worked in public relations and management. He co-authored the book The Memories: J.F.K., 1961–1963 with Cecil W. Stoughton and was a public relations consultant in the development of the John F. Kennedy Center for the Performing Arts.

Clifton died of pneumonia after an intestinal operation at the Walter Reed Army Medical Center in Washington, D.C. on December 23, 1991, and was survived by his widow, Anne Bodine (1915–2009). He and Anne are interred at Arlington National Cemetery.

Career
Clifton graduated from the United States Military Academy in 1936. During World War II Clifton served in the Field Artillery. Following the war he was assigned to Army Headquarters to work on public relations and later became an assistant to Omar Bradley. In 1956, he became Chief of Information of the Army. Clifton joined the Kennedy administration in 1961 as senior military aide. In this position Clifton was responsible for Kennedy's daily intelligence briefings on world events. He was in the motorcade in Dallas, Texas, on November 22, 1963, when Kennedy was shot. Following the assassination, Clifton was in charge of dealing with military and national security affairs from the aftermath. He retained this position in the Johnson administration until his retirement from the Army in 1965.

Awards
 Army Distinguished Service Medal
 Legion of Merit
 American Defense Service Medal
 American Campaign Medal
 European-African-Middle Eastern Campaign Medal
 World War II Victory Medal
 Army of Occupation Medal
 National Defense Service Medal
 Croix de Guerre (France)
 Italian War Cross of Military Valor

References

External links
 Conversations recorded aboard Air Force One on November 22, 1963 — digitized audio from original 1/4" reel-to-reel tapes discovered among the memorabilia of Chester Clifton Jr.

1913 births
1991 deaths
United States Army personnel of World War II
Burials at Arlington National Cemetery
Kennedy administration personnel
Lyndon B. Johnson administration personnel
New York Herald Tribune people
Writers from Edmonton
People from Puyallup, Washington
Recipients of the Croix de Guerre (France)
Recipients of the Distinguished Service Medal (US Army)
Recipients of the Legion of Merit
United States Army generals
United States Military Academy alumni
University of Washington alumni
University of Wisconsin–Madison School of Journalism & Mass Communication alumni
20th-century American writers